Andrea Müller (born 29 June 1974) is a German female former track and field athlete who competed in the pole vault. She was active during the early stages of the formal acceptance of women's pole vault into international programmes by the International Association of Athletics Federations. The former holder, Daniela Bártová, improved upon that the same month.

Internationally, she was a bronze medallist in the event at the 1994 Goodwill Games and took a silver medal at the 1997 European Cup. She was also a finalist at the 1996 European Athletics Indoor Championships and the 1997 Summer Universiade.

She was twice national champion in the pole vault, taking the title at the German Athletics Championships in both 1994 and 1997, with Christine Adams winning in the intervening years.

International competitions

National titles
German Athletics Championships
Pole vault: 1994, 1997

References

External links

Living people
1974 births
German female pole vaulters
World record setters in athletics (track and field)
Competitors at the 1994 Goodwill Games
Goodwill Games medalists in athletics